Bolaños is the municipal seat of Bolaños Municipality, Jalisco, Mexico.

Populated places in Jalisco